Nationality words link to articles with information on the nation's poetry or literature (for instance, Irish or France).

Events
 October 10 – American poet Ethel Lynn Beers' collected works "All Quiet Along The Potomac" and Other Poems (including her most well-known work "All Quiet Along the Potomac Tonight") are published; the following day she dies aged 52 at Orange, New Jersey.
 Critic and poet Theodore Watts-Dunton takes the alcoholic poet Algernon Charles Swinburne into his permanent care at Watts' Putney home.

Works published in English

United Kingdom
 Edwin Arnold, The Light of Asia; or, The Great Renunciation (see also The Light of the World 1891)
 Louisa Sarah Bevington, Key-Notes
 Robert Bridges, Poems (see also Poems 1873, 1880)
 Robert Browning, Dramatic Idyls, including "Ivàn Ivànovitch" (see also dramatic Idyls 1880)
 Edmund Gosse, New Poems
 Kate Greenaway, Under the Window: Pictures & Rhymes for Children
 Emily Pfeiffer, Quarterman's Grace, and Other Poems
 Alfred Lord Tennyson, The Lover's Tale

United States
 Ethel Lynn Beers, All Quiet Along the Potomac and Other Poems
 Oliver Wendell Holmes, The School-Boy
 Edmund Clarence Stedman, Lyrics and Idylls, with Other Poems
 Celia Thaxter, Drift-Weed

Works published in other languages
 Marcellus Emants, "Lilith", Netherlands
 Louis-Honoré Fréchette, Fleurs boréales, winner of the Prix Montyon of the French Academy; French language; Quebec, Canada
 José Hernández, Martin Fierro, the second part of an epic Spanish-language Argentine poem in which the hero defends his way of life against encroaching socialization and civilization; an example of the Gaucho poetry literary movement in Argentina (see also first part 1872)
 Victor Hugo, L'Art d'être grand-père, France
 Stéphane Mallarmé, Les Dieux antiques, France

Awards and honors

Births
Death years link to the corresponding "[year] in poetry" article:
 February 13 – Sarojini Naidu (died 1949) also known by the sobriquet Bharatiya Kokila ("The Nightingale of India"), poet (in English) and elected official who was president of the Indian National Congress and the first woman governor of Uttar Pradesh
 March 14 – Harold Monro (died 1932), English poet, proprietor of the Poetry Bookshop in London
 March 26 – Joseph Campbell (died 1987), Irish
 April 3 – Takashi Nagatsuka 長塚 節 (died 1915), Japanese poet and novelist
 April 14 – James Branch Cabell (died 1958), American writer
 May 10 – James Alexander Allan (died 1967), Australian poet and local historian
 June 21 – Leslie Holdsworth Allen (died 1964), Australian
 September 13 – James Larkin Pearson (died 1981), American poet, newspaper publisher; North Carolina Poet Laureate, 1953–1981
 October 2 – Wallace Stevens (died 1955), American
 October 13 – Patrick Joseph Hartigan (died 1952), Australian
 November 10 – Vachel Lindsay (died 1931), American
 December 18 – Paul Klee (died 1940), Swiss painter and poet of German nationality

Deaths

Death years link to the corresponding "[year] in poetry" article:
 February 2 – Richard Henry Dana Sr. (born 1787), American poet, critic and lawyer
 April 30 – Sarah Josepha Hale (born 1788), American writer and poet, author of the popular nursery rhyme "Mary Had a Little Lamb" and successful promoter of Thanksgiving Day as a national holiday
 August 21 – Frances Browne (born 1816), Irish novelist, short-story writer and poet
 September 20 – Rosanna Eleanor Leprohon (born 1829), Canadian novelist and poet
 October 11 – Ethel Lynn Beers (born 1827), American poet
 November 5 – James Clerk Maxwell (born 1831), Scottish mathematician and theoretical physicist
 date not known
 Chō Kōran (born 1804), female Japanese poet and nanga artist
 Aristotelis Valaoritis (born 1824), Greek poet

See also

 19th century in poetry
 19th century in literature
 List of years in poetry
 List of years in literature
 Victorian literature
 French literature of the 19th century
 Poetry

Notes

19th-century poetry
Poetry